The Nepean Stars of Bo is a Sierra Leonean football club based in Bo, Sierra Leone. They are currently a member of the Sierra Leone National Premier League, the highest division of football league in Sierra Leone. Nepean Stars have an intense rivalry with city rivals Bo Rangers.

Football clubs in Sierra Leone
Bo, Sierra Leone